Ferenc Keserű (12 December 1946 – 12 February 2019) was a Hungarian cyclist. He competed in the individual road race at the 1968 Summer Olympics.

References

External links
 

1946 births
2019 deaths
Hungarian male cyclists
Olympic cyclists of Hungary
Cyclists at the 1968 Summer Olympics
Sportspeople from Pécs